Paul Dupuy, History Lecturer at Paris' École Normale Supérieure, published in 1896 the first scientific biography of the mathematician Évariste Galois, titled "La vie d'Évariste Galois".

He attended the École Normale Supérieure at rue d'Ulm, Paris. His schoolmates included the future geographers Marcel Dubois and Bertrand Auerbach, and the future historians Georges Lacour-Gayet,  Salomon Reinach and Gustave Lanson.

In the 1890s, Dupuy was a prominent defender of the unjustly convicted Jewish French officer Alfred Dreyfus.

After his retirement from the École Normale Supérieure, he became one of the first teachers of the International School of Geneva, the world's first international school, which he joined in 1925 at the age of 70, and where he remained for 10 years.

He was the father of Marie-Thérèse Maurette.

Notes

Sources

External links 
La vie d'Évariste Galois par M. Paul Dupuy, Professeur agrégé d'histoire, surveillant général de l'École Normale. (Biography of Évariste Galois)

École Normale Supérieure alumni
French biographers
19th-century French historians
20th-century French historians
French male non-fiction writers
People from Loudun
1856 births
1948 deaths